The  2018–19 season will be the 4th season of competitive football by Hermannstadt, and their first ever in Liga I. Hermannstadt will compete in the Liga I and in Cupa României.

Previous season positions

Competitions

Liga I

The Liga I fixture list was announced on 5 July 2018.

Regular season

Table

Results summary

Results by round

Matches

Relegation round

Table

Results summary

Position by round

Matches

Cupa României

See also

 2018–19 Cupa României
 2018–19 Liga I

References

FC Hermannstadt seasons
Hermannstadt , FC